Production car racing, showroom stock racing, street stock, pure stock, touring and U-car racing are all categories of auto racing where unmodified (or very lightly modified) production cars race each other, outright and also in classes.  

Cars usually have a protective roll cage and run race tires (either slicks or radials).  Some freedoms are allowed, like gearbox coolers, giving the cars increased performance and components longevity. Production car racing, known in the US as "showroom stock", is an economical and rules restricted version of touring car racing.

Many production racing categories are based on particular makes of cars. There are many Porsche and Audi racing series around the world.  These are also called "one make series".  Some series use a handicapped start, where the smaller cars are released up to 45 seconds ahead of the larger cars, and are slowly caught, the idea being that all the cars are together at the finish of the race. Many series follow the group N regulation with a few exceptions. There are several different series that have run all over the world, most notably, Japan's Super Taikyu and IMSA's Firehawk Series which ran between the 1980s to 1990s all over the United States.

Major races include the Bathurst 6 Hour, Bahrain 24 Hour, Dubai 24 Hour and Malaysian 12 Hour and sanctioned by organisations such as the FIA and SCCA. Normally using an entry level formula, it has grown into a stand-alone series, with national, state and club events and championships. The first NASCAR "strictly stock" race was held at Charlotte Speedway, on June 19, 1949. Where a racing class requires that the cars raced be production vehicles only slightly adapted for racing, manufacturers typically produce a limited run of such vehicles for public sale so that they can legitimately race them in the class.  These cars are commonly called "homologation specials".

In British oval racing, the term "production car racing" has been used as an alternative for hot rods, as run in the West Country during the late 1960s to the mid-1970s, and a production car world championship race was held twice in the 1970s, won by Spence Morgan in 1974 and Ralph Sanders in 1975, both driving Ford Anglias.  The West Country production cars were later reclassified as hot rods to come in line with the country's other promoters although this causes some confusion with the history of the West country racing as there was another class called hot rods that ran on those tracks.

See also
Banger racing
Group N
Production car
Super 2000
Track day

References

External links 

 Australian Production Touring Car Championship PTCC (AASA) - 
 Pure Stock Muscle Car Drag Race 
 SCCA Production Car Racing - 
 UCAR CLASH SERIES 

Auto racing by type
Touring car racing series
Mixed-sex sports